Krasimir Donchev Karakachanov (born 29 March 1965) is a Bulgarian politician. He has been the leader of the IMRO – Bulgarian National Movement since 1991.

Biography 
Karakachanov says that he does not have any roots from the Macedonian region, but as a historian he became a specialist on the Macedonian issue. Before the Revolutions of 1989, Karakachanov, being a historian, was an informer of the Committee for State Security on Macedonian nationalism.

Karakachanov was a candidate in the 2011 Bulgarian presidential election, winning 1% of all votes cast in 10th place. Karakachanov took part in the 2014 European Parliament election as part of a coalition bloc with the Bulgaria without Censorship political party. In late July 2014, Karakachanov's IMRO – Bulgarian National Movement left the coalition to form a Patriotic Front electoral alliance together with Valeri Simeonov's National Front for the Salvation of Bulgaria. With Simeonov, he is the co-spokesman for the electoral bloc. Karakachanov stood as the candidate of the United Patriots coalition in the 2016 Bulgarian presidential election, with the MP Yavor Notev of Attack as his vice presidential candidate. They finished in third place with 573,016 votes or 14.97%. From 4 may 2017 to 21 may 2021 he was a deputy Prime minister for national security and Minister of defense in the then Government of Boyko Borisov.

Controversies 
Karakachanov, who was Bulgarian deputy prime minister, used unsocialized gypsies to describe Romani people in Bulgaria, a term critics said resembled Nazi terminology of asocial gypsies.

During the 2020–2021 Bulgarian protests against the incumbent right-wing government, Karakachanov associated the protesters with LGBT rights activists, and was quoted as saying: "We cannot let a few Sorosoid NGOs and small parties, that are not even in the parliament, get in power and destroy the country. In the name of what? To introduce gay marriage and to create a gender republic." After the-then prime minister Bojko Borisov proposed the draft of a new constitution to appease the public, Karakachanov wrote: "I am certain that IMRO will defend its position on strengthening family values and marriage as a union between a man and a woman, as well as placing the family at the core of all normative documents related to the rights of children. The institution of marriage should be guaranteed and the protection against the introduction of a third, fifth, or a 30th gender should be explicit." About a proposed reintroduction of compulsory military service for man, Karakachanov wrote: "This is one of the ways we will get our children away from the dangerous influence of gender ideology." In response, the Sofia Pride Organisational Committee, Bilitis, Deystvie, and the GLAS Foundation called for condemnation of his statements.

References 

1965 births
20th-century Bulgarian historians
Bulgarian nationalists
Candidates for President of Bulgaria
Deputy prime ministers of Bulgaria
Government ministers of Bulgaria
Defence ministers of Bulgaria
Living people
Members of the National Assembly (Bulgaria)
People from Ruse, Bulgaria